Gustavo Nieto Roa (born 3 April 1942) is a Colombian film director, producer and screenwriter. He has directed eleven films since 1973.

Selected filmography
 The Latin Immigrant (1980)
 Caín (1984)

References

External links

1942 births
Living people
Colombian film directors
Colombian film producers
Colombian screenwriters
Male screenwriters
People from Tunja